Kim Hyeong-il is a South Korean basketball player, who competed in the men's tournament at the 1956 Summer Olympics.

References

Year of birth missing (living people)
Living people
South Korean men's basketball players
Olympic basketball players of South Korea
Basketball players at the 1956 Summer Olympics
Place of birth missing (living people)